Silver hatchetfish may refer to:
 
 Marine hatchetfishes of the genus Argyropelecus
 The freshwater hatchetfish species Gasteropelecus levis